Thoressa masoni, or Mason's ace is a butterfly in the family Hesperiidae. It was described by Frederic Moore in 1879. It is found in the Indomalayan realm in Burma, Thailand, Laos and Vietnam.

References

External links
 Thoressa at Markku Savela's Lepidoptera and Some Other Life Forms

masoni
Butterflies described in 1879